Niemojowice-Kolonia  is a village in the administrative district of Gmina Żarnów, within Opoczno County, Łódź Voivodeship, in central Poland.

The village has a population of 90.

References

Niemojowice-Kolonia